The 2012 Denmark Super Series was a top level badminton competition held from October 16, 2012 to October 21, 2012 in Odense, Denmark. It was the ninth BWF Super Series competition on the 2012 BWF Super Series schedule. The total purse for the event was $400,000.

Men's singles

Seeds

  Lee Chong Wei (champion)
  Chen Long (semifinals)
  Chen Jin (first round)
  Simon Santoso (second round)
  Sho Sasaki (second round)
  Peter Gade (first round)
  Du Pengyu (final)
  Kenichi Tago (second round)

Top half

Bottom half

Finals

Women's singles

Seeds

  Wang Yihan (semifinals)
  Li Xuerui (quarterfinals)
  Saina Nehwal
  Wang Shixian (quarterfinals)
  Tine Baun (quarterfinals)
  Juliane Schenk
  Sung Ji-hyun (quarterfinals)
  Jiang Yanjiao (semifinals)

Top half

Bottom half

Finals

Men's doubles

Seeds

  Mathias Boe / Carsten Mogensen (semifinal)
  Cai Yun / Fu Haifeng (first round)
  Koo Kien Keat / Tan Boon Heong (final)
  Hiroyuki Endo / Kenichi Hayakawa (quarterfinal)
  Hong Wei / Shen Ye (first round)
  Hirokatsu Hashimoto / Noriyasu Hirata (quarterfinal)
  Kim Ki-jung / Kim Sa-rang (quarterfinal) 
  Bodin Issara / Maneepong Jongjit (quarterfinal)

Top half

Bottom half

Finals

Women's doubles

Seeds

  Tian Qing / Zhao Yunlei
  Wang Xiaoli / Yu Yang
  Bao Yixin / Zhong Qianxin
  Christinna Pedersen / Kamilla Rytter Juhl
  Shizuka Matsuo / Mami Naito
  Misaki Matsutomo / Ayaka Takahashi
  Eom Hye-won / Jang Ye-na
  Poon Lok Yan / Tse Ying Suet

Top half

Bottom half

Finals

Mixed doubles

Seeds

  Xu Chen / Ma Jin
  Zhang Nan / Zhao Yunlei
  Joachim Fischer Nielsen / Christinna Pedersen
  Tantowi Ahmad / Lilyana Natsir
  Chan Peng Soon / Goh Liu Ying
  Sudket Prapakamol / Saralee Thoungthongkam
  Robert Mateusiak / Nadiezda Zieba
  Chris Adcock /  Imogen Bankier

Top half

Bottom half

Finals

References

Sport in Odense
2012
Denmark Super Series Premier
Denmark Premier